Big Nick may refer to:

People
Big Nick Nicholas (1922–1997), a jazz saxophonist
John Nicholls (footballer) (born 1939), a former Australian rules footballer for Carlton

Other uses
"Big Nick", a composition by John Coltrane featured on the album Duke Ellington & John Coltrane dedicated to the jazz saxophonist known as "Big Nick"